The Investigation Must Go On  (translit. Haboleshet Hokeret) is a 2000 Israeli drama film directed by Marek Rozenbaum, which was nominated for 8 Israeli Film Academy Awards.

Plot 
Police investigator Micha Stein receives a tip that a singer, Shalom Shalom, is responsible for a recent robbery. Stein, who is excessively ambitious, arrests Shalom. A cat-and-mouse follows with two equally stubborn men playing off the contradictions of the characters. A wedding photographer with a crush on Shalom, Shalom's unconventional relationship with his wife, his line of work, his sliding moral compass all work against the inflexible Stein, who becomes captivated by Shalom's wife.

Cast 

 Haim Renan as Momi
 Assi Levy as Silvia
 Osnat Fishman as Zohar Shalom
 David Danino as Captain George Ohana
 Eyal Rozales as Robby
 Moshe Ivgy as Shalom Shalom
 Marek Rozenbaum
 Aki Avni as Lt. Micha Shtein

Reception
Nominated for 8 Israeli film awards and won a 2000 Wolgin Writing Prize.

References

External links 
 

2000 films
Israeli drama films
2000 drama films